{{taxobox
| name = Shaggy parasol
| image = Chlorophyllum rhacodes LC0093.jpg
| regnum = Fungi
| divisio = Basidiomycota
| classis = Agaricomycetes
| ordo = Agaricales
| familia = Agaricaceae
| genus = Chlorophyllum
| species_complex = Chlorophyllum rhacodes complex}}Shaggy parasol is the common name for three closely related species of mushroom, Chlorophyllum rhacodes (or rachodes), C. olivieri and C. brunneum, found in North America, Europe and Southern Africa (the latter species is also found in Australia).

Taxonomy
Chlorophyllum rhacodes, C. olivieri and C. brunneum were formerly known as Macrolepiota rhacodes or Lepiota rhacodes, but the name was changed on the basis of molecular phylogenetic evidence demonstrating a closer relationship to Chlorophyllum molybdites than to Macrolepiota procera. The subspecies Macrolepiota rhacodes var. brunneum was also elevated to species status as Chlorophyllum brunneum. Chlorophyllum olivieri is a closely related species that is also eaten as the "Shaggy Parasol".

Many reference works spell the epithet "rachodes" rather than "rhacodes". The spelling "rachodes" was used by Vittadini when he first published the species in 1835, but was erroneous as the Greek word rhakos 'piece of cloth' should be transcribed as rhacos. Index Fungorum keeps to the original author's spelling, "rachodes".

Description 
The shaggy parasol is a large and conspicuous agaric, with thick brown scales and protuberances on its fleshy white cap. The gills and spore print are both white in colour. Its stipe is slender, but bulbous at the base, is coloured uniformly and bears no patterns. It is fleshy, and a reddish, or maroon discoloration occurs and a pungent odour is evolved when it is cut. The egg-shaped caps become wider and flatter as they mature.

Edibility

The shaggy parasol is popularly praised as an edible mushroom. However, it contains toxins which can cause gastric upsets and some individuals show a strong allergic response even after cooking.

Furthermore, young shaggy parasols look identical to the poisonous Chlorophyllum molybdites (the mushroom that causes the most poisonings in North America yearly). Checking for a white spore print is essential as C. molybdites print is green (older specimens having slightly green gills). As a result, this mushroom is not recommended for inexperienced hunters.

Similar species
The shaggy parasol is similar in appearance to the similarly edible parasol mushroom, Macrolepiota procera. The latter grows considerably larger however, and is more likely to be found in the open than C. rhacodes which prefers more shade and dislikes open pastures and fields. Another distinguishing feature is that C. rhacodes lacks the brown bands that are on the stem of M. procera.

References

Further reading

 Collins Gem Guide: Mushrooms and Toadstools, Stefan Buczacki 1982.
 The Audubon Society Field Guide to North American Mushrooms, Knopf Publishing
 The Mushroom Book, Thomas Læssøe & Anna Del Conte, Dorling Kindersley, 1996.

Agaricaceae
Edible fungi
Fungi found in fairy rings
Fungi of Australia
Fungi native to Australia
Fungi of North America
Fungi of Europe
Fungus common names